|}
{| class="collapsible collapsed" cellpadding="0" cellspacing="0" style="clear:right; float:right; text-align:center; font-weight:bold;" width="280px"
! colspan="3" style="border:1px solid black; background-color: #77DD77;" | Also Ran

The 1998 Epsom Derby was a horse race which took place at Epsom Downs on Saturday 6 June 1998. It was the 219th running of the Derby, and it was won by High-Rise. The winner was ridden by Olivier Peslier and trained by Luca Cumani. The pre-race favourite Cape Verdi finished ninth.

Race details
 Sponsor: Vodafone
 Winner's prize money: £598,690
 Going: Good
 Number of runners: 15
 Winner's time: 2m 33.88s

Full result

* The distances between the horses are shown in lengths or shorter. shd = short-head; hd = head.† Trainers are based in Great Britain unless indicated.

Winner's details
Further details of the winner, High-Rise:

 Foaled: 3 May 1995, in Ireland
 Sire: High Estate; Dam: High Tern (High Line)
 Owner: Mohammed Obaid Al Maktoum
 Breeder: Mohammed Obaid Al Maktoum
 Rating in 1998 International Classifications: 129

Form analysis

Two-year-old races
Notable runs by the future Derby participants as two-year-olds in 1997.

 City Honours – 4th Washington Singer Stakes, 3rd Royal Lodge Stakes
 Second Empire – 1st Prix des Chênes, 1st Grand Critérium
 Cape Verdi – 2nd Chesham Stakes, 1st Lowther Stakes, 4th Cheveley Park Stakes
 Saratoga Springs – 1st Acomb Stakes, 3rd Champagne Stakes, 1st Beresford Stakes, 1st Racing Post Trophy
 Gulland – 1st Silver Tankard Stakes
 Mutamam – 3rd Racing Post Trophy
 Haami – 3rd Solario Stakes, 1st Somerville Tattersall Stakes
 King of Kings – 1st Railway Stakes, 2nd Anglesey Stakes, 1st Tyros Stakes, 1st National Stakes

The road to Epsom
Early-season appearances in 1998 and trial races prior to running in the Derby.

 High-Rise – 1st Lingfield Derby Trial
 City Honours – 2nd Dante Stakes
 Border Arrow – 1st Feilden Stakes, 3rd 2,000 Guineas, 3rd Dante Stakes
 Sunshine Street – 2nd Derrinstown Stud Derby Trial
 Greek Dance – 1st Glasgow Stakes
 The Glow-Worm – 1st Blue Riband Trial Stakes, 2nd Chester Vase
 Sadian – 2nd Lingfield Derby Trial
 Second Empire – 3rd Irish 2,000 Guineas
 Cape Verdi – 1st 1,000 Guineas
 Saratoga Springs – 1st Dante Stakes, 4th Prix du Jockey Club
 Gulland – 2nd Craven Stakes, 1st Chester Vase
 Courteous – 1st Sandown Classic Trial
 Mutamam – 2nd Predominate Stakes
 Haami – 5th 2,000 Guineas
 King of Kings – 1st 2,000 Guineas

Subsequent Group 1 wins
Group 1 / Grade I victories after running in the Derby.

 Sunshine Street – San Juan Capistrano Handicap (2000)
 Greek Dance – Bayerisches Zuchtrennen (2000)
 Mutamam – Canadian International Stakes (2001)

Subsequent breeding careers
Leading progeny of participants in the 1998 Epsom Derby.

Sires of Group/Grade One winners
King Of Kings (15th) Stood in Australia, America, Switzerland and South Africa
 Reigning To Win - 1st T.J. Smith Stakes (2006)
 Ike's Dream - 1st Queen of the Turf Stakes (2005)
 King's Chapel - 1st New Zealand 2000 Guineas (2003)
 Arlette - Dam of Alexandros (2nd Lockinge Stakes 2009)

Sires of National Hunt horses
Second Empire (8th) - Later exported to South Africa
 Auroras Encore - 1st Grand National 2013
 Somersby - 1st Clarence House Chase 2012
 Strangely Brown - 1st Prix Alain du Breil 2005
Sunshine Street (4th)
 Ely Brown - 1st Towton Novices' Chase 2014

Other Stallions
City Honours (2nd) - Miley Shah - 1st Grade 3 Hurdle 2012High-Rise (1st) - Sired winners in Japan before standing in Ireland to sire jumps winnersGreek Dance (5th) - Stood in Germany before retiring due to severe fertility problemsSadian (7th) - Exported to Saudi ArabiaSaratoga Springs (10th) - Minor flat and jumps winnersGulland (11th) - Minor jumps winners and flat placed horseCourteous (12th) - Minor flat and jumps winnersMutamam (13th) - Minor flat winners - Exported to ItalyHaami (14th) - Exported to Cyprus

Broodmare
Cape Verdi (9th)
 Nabucco - Won ten races - listed wins on flat and over hurdles
 Benandonner - Thirteen wins on flat including at Shergar Cup
 Thoura - Won thrice at three before suffering fatal injury

References

External links
 Colour Chart – Derby 1998

Epsom Derby
 1998
Epsom Derby
Epsom Derby
20th century in Surrey